Ndaba Walter Mhlongo (3 July 1933 – 29 October 1989)  was a South African actor and choreographer best known for his role of Mshefane in the 1977 production Inyakanyaka. Ndaba is widely regarded as one of South Africa's most prominent comedians. Joe Mafela, himself an established comedian, described Ndaba's comedy as effortless.

Career
Mhlongo is well known for the comedy Inyakanyaka (meaning trouble), and the dramatic film uDeliwe in which he acted with his wife and son. His other known works include Isivumelwano, Upondo no Nkinsela, Bad Company, and Strike Force.

Personal life
Mhlongo was married to actress Mary Twala. They had 2 children together; Archie and Somizi.

Awards and nominations
Mhlongo received a Tony Award nomination for Best Choreography on Mbongeni Ngema's Sarafina! in 1988.

Filmography

References

External links

South African male film actors
People from KwaZulu-Natal
1933 births
1989 deaths